Los Cedrales is a district of the Alto Paraná Department, Paraguay.